Huápoca is an archaeological site located 36 kilometers west of Ciudad Madera, in the Huápoca Canyon region, northwest of the Mexican state of Chihuahua.

Visitors to the Huápoca region visit the Rio Papigochi and sites such as the Aguila and Serpiente caves, the Huápoca Spa and the Huápoca bridge, with access to the archaeological sites.

In the Madera region, there are approximately 150 archaeological sites scattered across the cliffs. Most of them are in varying states of repair, with some damage caused by several factors, including the lack of attention, care and surveillance. Adobe floors are broken in several places, and walls are damaged with graffiti, even over old glyphs.

First regional investigations 
In 1898, Norwegian Explorer Darl Lumbholtz, provided first notices about caves in the Madera region, in the north of Sierra Tarahumara. Discovered several sites, among them Cueva del Garabato (scribble), now known as Cuarenta Casas.

Subsequently, several anthropologists and archaeologists briefly explored the region, focusing especially on the outskirts of Cuarenta Casas. Almost all of them published the results of their studies; However, very little is known about the caves, exploration and systematic study is still not extensive.

H.A. Carey in 1931.
E.B. Sayles in 1936
A.V. Kidder in 1939,
R.H. Lister in 1946 & 1958
Eduardo Contreras in 1959
Arturo Guevara in 1986,
David Pearson, Fernando Sánchez M. and D, Phillips in 1990.

Madera Zone
Madera was a sawmill that worked lumber extracted in the forests nearby; its greatest attractions are the ancient caves around the region, which served as room and shelter for inhabitants of the Paquimé culture, who built their homes within them.

There are several Paquimé culture archaeological zones in the area of Madera municipality. The most important caves are:

Cueva Grande
Located 66 kilometers west of Madera, on a dirt road. Cueva Grande hides within convoluted land and behind branches of trees. The mouth of the cave is obscured by a waterfall from the top of the cave to a stream.
There are two, double-story houses (800 years old) that are good examples of the native construction techniques. There is also a round grain storage area behind the structure.

La Ranchería 
La Cueva La Ranchería, it is a residential complex, larger than Cuarenta Casas. Its area is 50 meters long and 20 m wide. Most of the rooms are double-deck and large. There are also granaries (Cuexcomate) - somewhat damaged, made from adobe and straw, in which maize was stored.

Cueva del Puente
45 kilómeters north of Madera

Cuarenta Casas 
Cuevas El Garabato or Cueva de Las Ventanas, known as Cuarenta Casas was built between 1060 and 1205 CE, residential complex of the Paquimé culture inhabitants.

This complex (located in the Garabato Creek) has an interesting number of constructions and the great cave, guarded by a small waterfall.

Cueva de la Momia
The mummified body of an adult male, surrounded by offerings such as ceramics, stone utensils, stems and tender corn cobs (elotes) were found inside the cave.  The mummy is now in the Capitan Leal Museum in Ciudad Madera. Its conservation condition is excellent.

It is believed that the cave, located very near the Barranca Arroyo del Venado, had more mummies in good condition, but had been destroyed by irresponsible visitors.  The cave is divided in two levels, the second level has more than ten rooms in optimal conditions.

Cueva de las Jarillas 

Cueva de las Jarillas is one of the largest housing caves in the Madera region in Chihuahua. Has more than 20 rooms and a Cuexcomate.

New Discoveries 
In one of the Rio Papigochi side canyons, southwest of Madera, is a complex that was inhabited by ancient communities that built homes in the caves and rock shelters. These sites are so safe that to date are virtually intact.

None of these caves can be easily seen, the only way to know they are there, is when you are inside.

Cueva de los Fierros 
Located in the middle of the Canyon slope in an almost vertical wall. Its size is about 30 m and has a complex of at least 10 adobe rooms, some of them in two floors. The whole has a foundation base, as a terrace, on which the rooms were built, the windows are "T" shape, typical paquimé culture.

Almost all rooms are partially destroyed; ceilings still preserved the original wooden structure, inside were found some stone tools such as scrapers, knives, grindstones, fragments of pottery and other objects which could not be identified. There were many olotes found, evidence of corn consumptions and storage.

Cueva de la Puerta
Located a few hundred meters from the first cave, also found in the middle of the canyon wall. It measures around 25 m and presents vestiges of approximately 12 rooms or enclosures, vandals or treasure hunters partially destroyed floors and walls.

It can be appreciated how ancient houses were built. For construction they used a kind of braided rods and branches of local trees, mainly tascar (local species of Juniper) and Fraxinus, over the braids they shaped the adobe walls. The braid is well preserved, still has the fiber used to fasten them. There are two types of fastening; one made with "palmilla" fiber (a species of Century Plant or agave and the other with a tree branch called "sawarique". In one of the rooms, the original floor can be seen, made from adobe so well and smooth finished that it looks like cement. Roof and walls of rooms are black, probably by the accumulation of soot and smoke from fires that through hundreds of years were lit there.  There is another cave in the opposite side of the canyon, is smaller with only three rooms, but very well preserved.

Half a kilometer above is a small cave with a lonely and small house in very good condition. With an excellent view of the Canyon, probably this place was an observation or surveillance point.

Cultural background 

Human groups of hunter-gatherers arrive in the region from the north, probably Mogollon, Anasazi or Hohokam, following the Sierra Madre Occidental; used plants, took advantage of smaller animal species, as turkeys; occupied the mountains and gradually dispersed in rivers, developing the Paquimé  culture or "Casas Grandes", whose first settlers were collectors in the process of learning sedentary traits.

Mogollon ( or ) culture evidences have been found, simple ceramic fragments and other more scarce luxury type materials, characteristic of the Paquime culture. The Site constructors probably were villagers who in addition to intensively exploit the environment, as can be seen in the premises vestiges, cultivated corn, squash, and beans, therefore they established a community use system.

Important evidence exists of northern Mexico settlers, of the Casas Grandes culture, a sub-region of the Mogollon culture, that along with the Anasazi and the Hohokam comprise the Oasisamerica area. The northern cultural region is known in Mexico as "Gran Chichimeca" and in United States is called American Southwest.

Sites of culture are located in the State of Chihuahua; Paquimé was the head and commercial center of the region. The first settlements in this culture are dated 1000 BCE, since the late archaic); its apogee occurred between 1261 and 1300 CE, and disappeared in 1450 CE.

The difficult nature of this area shaped the distinctive traits of its inhabitants; who developed from nomadic hunter-gatherers to sedentary, farmed the land and animals.

Sites of the culture are found from the Pacific Ocean coast to the Sierra Madre Occidental, passing through all kinds of ecological and climate environment.

The Site 

En este sitio se encuentran vestigios de la Cultura Casas Grandes. Está formado por cuevas en medio de un emplazamiento de gran espectacularidad.

The site is a complex of archaeological sites near the hot springs Huapoca. The various groups construction was made with adobe and fiber reinforcement.

These caves are considered the most impressive built on cliffs. Preserved structures are complete.

The Huápoca caves consist of the "Serpiente" and the Nido de Aguila caves. These are considered the most impressive on a cliff. It has complete structures.

Both caves have magnificent views of the Huápoca Canyon.

The site remains depict cultural construction patterns similar to the entire region.

Cueva Grande 
It is a very large and deep cave 3 km west of river Huapoca and Spa. It is a complex of two floors. A cascade falls on the entrance of the cave.

Cueva de la Serpiente
It comprises constructions in perfect preservation conditions. It is a residential complex with about 15 rooms with the characteristic shaped "T" doors. The cave has two entrances and a passage through a rocky outcrop, accessible through a ladder.

Nido del Águila

This cave is composed of several small houses in a rock edge, at an elevation of two-thirds of the height of the almost vertical cliff. Is a smaller cave, with two buildings, one of at least three rooms situated on the edge of the cliff and the other a two-story room in the middle of the esplanade, in the middle of the cave.

See also 
Mogollon
Oasisamerica
Ciudad Madera
Chihuahua (state)
Cuarenta Casas
Cueva de la Momia
Cueva de la Olla (archaeological site)
Cueva de la Ranchería

Notes

External links 
Municipio de Madera 
The Mogollon: Prehistoric Desert Peoples
People of the Colorado Plateau
National Park Service official site
Firecracker Pueblo 
Los Sitios Olvidados. 

Archaeological sites in Chihuahua (state)
Cliff dwellings
Mogollon culture
Oasisamerica cultures
Tourist attractions in Chihuahua (state)